The Impossible Elephant is a 2001 Canadian adventure comedy film directed by Martin Wood and written by Robert C. Cooper. The film premiered at the Sprockets Toronto International Film Festival for Children on April 20, 2001 and was later released on home media by the distributor Peace Arch Entertainment.

Synopsis
A boy named Daniel, whose mother has recently passed away, wishes upon a star for an elephant. His wish comes true when one appears in his clubhouse, much to the disapproval of his father. When they bring it to a zoo, they find out that the elephant is sick and will be shipped to San Diego to be taken care of. When attempting to help his adopted pet escape, with the help of his friend Gilbert, they realize the elephant possesses the ability to fly.

Cast
Mark Rendall as Daniel Harris
Alex Doduk as Gilbert (Trout)
Nicholas Lea as Steven Harris
Mia Sara as Molly Connor
Jordan Becker as "Butterbutt"
Dwayne Brenna as Principal Duncan
Sheldon Bergstrom as Jack

Production
The production design was done by Kathleen Climie, and the movie was filmed in Saskatoon, Saskatchewan. The soundtrack was created by Michael Richard Plowman.

Reception
Ken Eisner of Variety called the film a "more-than-serviceable kidpic that makes good use of real and mechanical pachyderms to whip up a boy's-own tale of a magical Dumbo loose in the ‘burbs."

Awards
The film won the Best Feature Film award at the Toronto Sprockets International Film Festival for Children in 2001, while director Wood and screenwriter Cooper were nominated at the Gemini Awards for "Best Direction in a Children's or Youth Program or Series" and "Best Writing in a Children's or Youth Program or Series" respectively.

References

External links
 
 
 

2000s adventure comedy films
2000s children's fantasy films
2001 comedy films
2001 films
2000s English-language films
Films directed by Martin Wood
Canadian adventure comedy films